The Pennsylvania State Game Lands Number 280 are Pennsylvania State Game Lands in Berks County in Pennsylvania in the United States providing hunting, bird watching, and other activities.

Geography
SGL 274 consists of three parcels located in Bern, Penn, and Lower Heidelberg Townships in Berks County. Blue Marsh Lake, located between parcels of SGL 280, is part of the Tulpehocken Creek watershed, which is part of the watershed of the Schuylkill River and ultimately, the Delaware River. Nearby communities include the City of Reading, the boroughs of Bernville and Leesport, and populated places Brownsville, Fairview Heights, Garfield, Leinbachs, Mount Pleasant, North Heidelberg, Pleasant Valley, Rickenbach, State Hill, Van Reeds Mill, and West Leesport. U.S. Route 222 passes to the southeast, Pennsylvania Route 183 passes between two parcels of SGL 280.

West Leesport

Statistics

See also
 Pennsylvania State Game Lands
 Pennsylvania State Game Lands Number 43, also located in Berks County
 Pennsylvania State Game Lands Number 52, also located in Berks and Lancaster Counties
 Pennsylvania State Game Lands Number 80, also located in Berks County
 Pennsylvania State Game Lands Number 106, also located in Berks County
 Pennsylvania State Game Lands Number 110, also located in Berks County
 Pennsylvania State Game Lands Number 182, also located in Berks County
 Pennsylvania State Game Lands Number 274, also located in Berks County
 Pennsylvania State Game Lands Number 315, also located in Berks County
 Pennsylvania State Game Lands Number 324, also located in Berks County

References

280
Protected areas of Berks County, Pennsylvania